Deborah E. Citrin is an American clinician-scientist researching pre-clinical and clinical testing of radiation modifiers and the mechanisms of normal tissue injury from radiation. She is a senior investigator and deputy director of the National Cancer Institute's Center for Cancer Research.

Life 
Citrin completed a B.S. in biology at North Carolina State University. She earned a M.D. at Duke University School of Medicine. In 2001, Citrin came to the National Cancer Institute (NCI) and the National Capital Consortium to compete residency training.

At NCI, Citrin became a staff clinician (2005–2007), an associate clinical investigator (2006–2007), and an investigator (2007). She is a clinician and translational researcher in the radiation oncology branch at NCI. Citrin is a senior investigator and deputy director of the NCI Center for Cancer Research. Her research interests include the pre-clinical and clinical testing of radiation modifiers and the mechanisms of normal tissue injury from radiation. Citrin is involved in the clinical care of patients with genitourinary cancers (prostate and bladder) and gastrointestinal cancers. Citrin develops strategies to enhance the capacity of radiation to kill tumor cells while protecting normal tissue from the side effects of radiation treatment. Her laboratory work focuses on aging in tissue exposed to radiation through stem cell senescence. She is board certified by the American Board of Radiology.

Citrin has 3 children.

References 

Living people
Year of birth missing (living people)
Place of birth missing (living people)
American medical researchers
Women medical researchers
Cancer researchers
North Carolina State University alumni
Duke University School of Medicine alumni
National Institutes of Health people
21st-century American women physicians
21st-century American physicians
21st-century American women scientists
Physician-scientists